This is list of Minister of Ministry of Defence of Thailand. Aside from Prime Ministers holding the post concurrently, all ministers have been active-duty or retired flag officers.

Minister of Defence of Siam 
List of Siamese Ministers of Defense (Senabodi Kalahom)

Minister of Defence of Thailand 
List of Minister of Defence of Thailand (Thai: รัฐมนตรีว่าการกระทรวงกลาโหม Ratthamontri Wakarn Kasuang Kalahom)

See also
Ministry of Defence

References

External links 
List of ministers –  Ministry of Defence (Thailand)

Lists of political office-holders in Thailand